Fritz Steuri may refer to:
 Fritz Steuri (1887–1969), Swiss mountain climber and Nordic and Alpine skier
 Fritz Steuri II (1903–1955), Swiss mountain climber and Nordic and Alpine skier
 Fritz Steuri III (1908–1953), Swiss ski jumpers and Nordic combined skiers